The Pardon is a 2013 drama film directed by Tom Anton. Filmed in Shreveport, Louisiana, it stars Jaime King as Toni Jo Henry, a woman who overcomes a tragic beginning but was executed for murder, and John Hawkes as "Arkie" Burke, Henry's partner in the crime.

The picture is based on an actual case tried in Louisiana in the 1940s. Adapted from the true crime book Stone Justice by Evelyn L. Morgan and Debi King McMartin.

Plot
With all the picturesque glamour of the 1940s, The Pardon recounts the unlikely true story of Toni Jo Henry (Jaime King), a woman tried three times and executed in Louisiana, 1942.

Surviving a legacy of childhood abuse, which lands her in the art deco brothels of the time, Toni Jo briefly discovers love and happiness when she marries the dashing boxer Cowboy Henry (Jason Lewis). Cowboy is soon after sent to prison, leaving the bereft Toni Jo to embark on an ill-fated mission with Cowboy's sometime partner Arkie (John Hawkes). A grisly murder and a series of sensational trials where she pleads her innocence instantly makes the beautiful Toni Jo into a celebrity. Facing conviction after conviction, will she find true redemption in the face of the crimes for which she is accused?

Cast
 Jaime King as Toni Jo Henry 
 Jason Lewis as Claude "Cowboy" Henry 
 M. C. Gainey as Gibbs Duhon 
 Leigh Whannell  as Clement Moss 
 John Hawkes as Finnon "Arkie" Burke 
 T. J. Thyne as Father Richard 
 Tim Guinee as Norman Anderson  
 Niki Spiridakos as Niki 
 Brad Dison as a Reporter 
 Stuart Greer as George McQuiston 
 Ed Bruce as J. P. Copeland 
 Kip Cummings as Deputy Sheriff
 Nancy Ellen Mills as Mrs Calloway
 Celeste Roberts as Aunt Emma
 Jeddah Danielle Salera as Young Toni Jo Henry
 Jim Dickson as prison guard

External links
 
 
 

2013 films
American crime drama films
2013 crime drama films
Films about capital punishment
Films based on non-fiction books
Films set in Louisiana
2010s English-language films
2010s American films